USS Camanche may refer to the following ships of the United States Navy:

 , a 1,335-ton  monitor, was prefabricated at Jersey City, New Jersey by Secor Brothers, Co.
 , properly  as the ship was never commissioned, was the lead ship of the s.

References 

United States Navy ship names